Budapest is the capital of Hungary. Below is a list of public place names of Budapest that refer to famous people, cities or historic events. Generality of Budapest's public place names relate to the Hungarian national history. In Budapest there are about 8,600 named public place (streets, squares, parks etc.).

Notable people

András Áchim, Hungarian peasant politician
Endre Ady, Hungarian poet
Dürer Ajtósi, Hungarian-German painter
High Prince Álmos, ancient Hungarian leader, father of Árpád
Gyula Andrássy, Hungarian statesman, see: Andrássy út
István Angyal, Freedom fighter of the Hungarian revolution of 1956
János Apáczai Csere, Hungarian writer and pedagogue
Vilmos Apor, bishop, Righteous among the Nations
János Arany, Hungarian poet, see: Arany János utca
Árpád, ancient Hungarian leader, "father of the Hungarians", see: Árpád híd
Kemal Atatürk, statesman of Turkey
Attila, king of the Huns
Lajos Aulich, Minister of War during Hungarian revolution of 1848
Mihály Babits, Hungarian poet
Endre Bajcsy-Zsilinszky, Hungarian anti-fascist politician during World War II, see: Bajcsy-Zsilinszky út
József Bajza, Hungarian poet, see: Bajza utca
Bálint Balassi, Hungarian poet
Gábor Baross, Hungarian statesman
Béla Bartók, Hungarian composer
István Báthory, prince of Transylvania
Lajos Batthyány, The first prime minister of Hungary, see: Batthyány tér
Sándor Bauer, Hungarian student, victim of the communism
József Bem, Polish general during Hungarian revolution of 1848, national hero
Miklós Bercsényi, Kuruc general
Dániel Berzsenyi, Hungarian poet
György Bessenyei, Hungarian poet
Gábor Bethlen, prince of Transylvania
János Bihari, Hungarian Gypsi musician
Lujza Blaha, Hungarian actress, see: Blaha Lujza tér
István Bocskai, prince of Transylvania
Simón Bolívar, "The Liberator"
János Bolyai, Hungarian mathematician
Winston Churchill, prime minister of the UK
Csaba, mythological King of the Székelys
Mihály Csokonai Vitéz, Hungarian poet
János Csonka, Hungarian inventor
Leonardo da Vinci, Italian polymath
Jenő Dalnoki, Hungarian footballer
János Damjanich, general during Hungarian revolution of 1848, national hero
Ferenc Deák, Hungarian statesman, The Wise Man of the Nation, see: Deák Ferenc tér
Henrik Dembinszky, Polish general during Hungarian revolution of 1848
Gyula Derkovits, Hungarian painter
Arisztid Dessewffy, general during Hungarian revolution of 1848
Edit Domján, Hungarian actress
György Dózsa, peasants' revolt leader, see: Dózsa György út
József Eötvös, Hungarian minister and writer
Ferenc Erkel, Hungarian composer
Erzsébet, Austro-Hungarian queen, see: Erzsébet híd, Erzsébetváros, Pesterzsébet
János Esterházy, Hungarian martyr politician
Lipót Fejér, Hungarian mathematician
Árpád Feszty, Hungarian painter
György Fráter, Hungarian statesman
Áron Gábor, Artillery during Hungarian revolution of 1848, national hero
Géza Gárdonyi, Hungarian writer
Giuseppe Garibaldi, Italian military and political figure
Géza, ancient Hungarian leader
Gyula, ancient Hungarian leader
Alfréd Hajós, The first Olympic champion of Hungary
Nándor Hidegkuti, footballer of the Golden Team, see: Hidegkuti Nándor Stadium
Victor Hugo, French poet
János Hunyadi, Hungarian military and political figure
Gyula Illyés, Hungarian writer
Mari Jászai, Hungarian actress
John Paul II, Pope
Mór Jókai, Hungarian writer
Attila József, Hungarian poet
János Kálvin, Protestant teologian, see: Kálvin tér
Kálmán Kandó, Hungarian engineer
Frigyes Karinthy, Hungarian poet and journalist
József Katona, Hungarian playwright and poet
Ferenc Kazinczy, reformatory of Hungarian language
Gáspár Károli, Hungarian Calvinist pastor
Zsigmond Kemény, Hungarian author
Pál Kinizsi, Hungarian general
Sándor Kisfaludy, Hungarian poet
Ernő Kiss, general during Hungarian revolution of 1848
János Kis, Hungarian lieutenant-general
György Klapka, general during Hungarian revolution of 1848
Sándor Kocsis, footballer of the Golden Team
Lajos Kossuth, Hungarian statesman, regent of Hungary during 1848 Revolution, freedom fighter and national hero, see: Kossuth Lajos tér
Ferenc Kölcsey, Hungarian poet
Lehel, ancient Hungarian leader, see: Lehel tér
Károly Leiningen-Westerburg, general during Hungarian revolution of 1848
Ferenc Liszt, Hungarian composer, see: Budapest Ferenc Liszt International Airport
Károly Lotz, Hungarian-German painter
Imre Madách, Hungarian writer
Péter Mansfeld, freedom fighter during Hungarian revolution of 1956
Margit, saint, daughter of king Béla IV of Hungary, see: Margit-sziget, Margit híd
Mária, mother of Jesus
Ignác Martinovics, Hungarian Jacobin leader
Mátyás király, king of Hungary
Kelemen Mikes, Hungarian political figure and essayist
Kálmán Mikszáth, Hungarian writer
Ferenc Molnár, Hungarian writer
Ferenc Móra, Hungarian writer
Zsigmond Móricz, Hungarian writer, see: Móricz Zsigmond körtér
Mihály Munkácsy, Hungarian painter
Imre Nagy, prime minister of Hungary during Hungarian revolution of 1956
Lajos Nagy, king of Hungary
József Nagysándor, general during Hungarian revolution of 1848
László Németh, Hungarian writer
János Neumann, Hungarian mathematician
Pál Nyáry, politician during Hungarian revolution of 1848
Ond vezér, ancient Hungarian leader
Balázs Orbán, Hungarian writer
Olof Palme, Swedish social-democrat politician
Örs vezér, ancient Hungarian leader, see: Örs vezér tere
Péter Pázmány, Hungarian theologist
Mór Perczel, general during Hungarian revolution of 1848
Sándor Petőfi, national poet of Hungary, freedom fighter and national hero, see: Petőfi híd
Frigyes Podmaniczky, Hungarian politician, developer of Budapest (avenues, boulevards, bridges etc.)
Mihály Pollack, Austro-Hungarian architect
Ernő Pöltenberg, general during Hungarian revolution of 1848
Elvis Presley, American singer
Ferenc Puskás, footballer of the Golden Team, see: Puskás Ferenc Stadium
Miklós Radnóti, Hungarian poet
Ferenc Rákóczi, Hungarian Kuruc leader
Lipót Rottenbiller, mayor of Pest
Ignác Semmelweis, Hungarian physician
Imre Sinkovits, Hungarian actor
János Sobieski, king of Poland
Aurél Stromfeld, staff officer of the Hungarian Soviet Republic
Ervin Szabó, Hungarian social scientist
Lőric Szabó, Hungarian poet
István Széchenyi, Hungarian statesman, "The greatest Hungarian"
Bertalan Szemere, prime minister of Hungary
Hannah Szenes, Hungarian poet
Szent Adalbert, master of Stephen I of Hungary
Szent Benedek, Christian saint
Szent Gellért, Christian saint, see: Gellérthegy
Szent György, Christian saint
Szent Imre, son of Stephen I of Hungary
Szent István, the first king of Hungary, founder of Hungary (1000–1001)
Szent János, Christian saint
Szent József, father of Jesus
Szent Kristóf, Christian saint
Szent László, king of Hungary
Szent Orbán, Christian saint
Dezső Szilágyi, Hungarian jurist and politician
Erzsébet Szilágyi, mother of Matthias Corvinus of Hungary
József Simándy, Hungarian tenor
Pál Szinyei Merse, Hungarian painter
Mihály Táncsics, Hungarian poet and politician
Vilmos Tartsay, Hungarian anti-fascist general during World War II
Blanka Teleki, Hungarian early feminist
László Teleki, Hungarian writer and politician
Kálmán Thaly, Hungarian poet
Imre Thököly, Hungarian Kuruc leader
Sebestyén Tinódi Lantos, Hungarian lyricist
Ferenc Toldy, Hungarian literary historian
Árpád Tóth, Hungarian poet
István Türr, Hungarian freedom fighter
Vak Bottyán, Hungarian Kuruc general
Gereben Vas, Hungarian poet and writer
Pál Vasvári, Hungarian freedom fighter during Hungarian revolution of 1848
Mihály Vörösmarty, Hungarian poet
Raul Wallenberg, Swedish humanitarian
Albert Wass, Hungarian writer
Miklós Wesselényi, Hungarian statesman
József Zakariás, footballer of the Golden Team
György Zala, Hungarian architect
Mihály Zichy, Hungarian painter
Miklós Zrínyi, Hungarian poet and general
This list is not complete, it consists only the most notable people and the most common public place names.
This list is in Hungarian alphabetical order!

Others
Akácfa (wattle tree)
Akácos (wattle wood)
Alkotmány (Constitution)
Állomás (train station)
Anna (given name for girls)
Apahida (former Hungarian village)
Aradi (former Hungarian city)
Bácskai (Hungarian land)
Balatoni (Hungarian lake)
Bánya (mine)
Bártfa (former Hungarian city)
Bécsi (Wiener)
Béke (peace)
Beregszász (former Hungarian city)
Botond (Hungarian given name for boys)
Brassó (former Hungarian city)
Cica (kitten)
Csallóköz (ethnic Hungarian land)
Csap (former Hungarian city)
Csíksomlyó (former Hungarian village)
Csillag (star)
Csongor (Hungarian given name for boys)
Diófa (nut tree)
Duna (Danube)
Eperjes (former Hungarian city)
Erdélyi (former Hungarian land)
Erőmű (power plant)
Érsekújvár (former Hungarian city)
Fátra (former Hungarian mountains)
Fecske (swallow)
Felsőbánya (former Hungarian city)
Fenyves (pine-grove)
Fiume (former Hungarian city)
Fogaras (former Hungarian city)
Fő (Main, for ex.: Main street, Main square)
Füredi (Hungarian city)
Garam (former Hungarian river)
Garázs (garage)
Gyár (factory)
Gyöngyvirág (lily of the valley)
Gyulafehérvár (former Hungarian city)
Hargita (Székely-Hungarian mountains and county)
Háromszék (Székely-Hungarian land)
Hársfa (Tilia)
Határ (city limit, city boundary, see: Határ út)
Hold (moon)
Honvéd (Honvéd is a soldier from the Hungarian National Army)
Hősök (heroes', see: Hősök tere)
Hungária (Latin name of Hungary)
Ibolya (viola)
Igló (former Hungarian city)
Ipolyság (former Hungarian city)
Iskola (school)
Jegenye (black poplar)
Kálvária (calvary)
Kápolna (chapel)
Kassai (former Hungarian city)
Kereszt (Christian cross)
Késmárki (former Hungarian city)
Királyhágó (pass in Apuseni Mountains)
Kolozsvári (former Hungarian city)
Komáromi (Hungarian city)
Kőrös (Hungarian river)
Köztársaság (republic)
Kuruc (Hungarian anti-Habsburg movement)
Léva (former Hungarian city)
Liget (grove)
Liliom (Lilium)
Losonc (former Hungarian city)
Lőcse (former Hungarian city)
Magyar (Hungarian)
Május 1. (May Day)
Máramarosi (former Hungarian land)
Maros (Hungarian river)
Mátra (Hungarian mountains)
Meggyfa (sour cherry tree)
Nádor (Hungarian dignitary)
Nagybánya (former Hungarian city)
Nagybecskerek (former Hungarian city)
Nagyenyed (former Hungarian city)
Nagykikinda (former Hungarian city)
Nagyszalonta (former Hungarian city)
Nagyszeben (former Hungarian city)
Nagyszombat (former Hungarian city)
Nagyszőlős (former Hungarian city)
Nagyvárad (former Hungarian city, see: Nagyvárad tér)
Nap (sun)
Nefelejcs (forget me not)
Nyár (summer)
Nyitra (former Hungarian city)
Nyúl (rabbit)
Ógyalla (former Hungarian city)
Pacsirta (skylark)
Pálma (palm tree)
Pannónia (Pannonia province)
Pázsit (grass)
Pillangó (butterfly), see: Pillangó utca
Poprád (former Hungarian city)
Pozsonyi (former Hungarian city)
Rákos (Brook in Budapest)
Rezeda (Reseda)
Rigó (oriole)
Rimaszombat (former Hungarian city)
Római (Roman)
Rózsa (rose)
Rozsnyó (former Hungarian city)
Sáfrány (saffron)
Sajó (Hungarian river)
Sas (eagle)
Segesvár (former Hungarian city)
Sólyom (falcon)
Sport
Stefánia (Stephanie, given name for girls)
Szabadka (former Hungarian city)
Szabadság (liberty)
Szamos (Hungarian river)
Szatmár (Hungarian land)
Szegfű (clove pink)
Szigetvári (Hungarian city)
Szőlő (Vitis)
Tátra (former Hungarian mountains)
Tavasz (spring)
Temesvári (former Hungarian city)
Temető (graveyard)
Templom (church)
Tihany (Hungarian village)
Tisza (Hungarian river)
Tordai (former Hungarian city)
Torockó (ethnic Hungarian village in Transylvania)
Török (Turkish)
Trencsén (former Hungarian city)
Tulipán (tulip)
Turul (mythological national bird of the Hungarians and Hungary)
Tüzér (artilleryman)
Udvarhely (former Hungarian county)
Ugocsa (former Hungarian county)
Újvidék (former Hungarian city)
Ungvár (former Hungarian city)
Uzsoki (former Hungarian mountains)
Vág (former Hungarian river)
Vágóhíd (slaughterhouse)
Városház (city hall)
Vasút (railway)
Vereckei (pass in the Carpathians)
Vezér (ruler)
Viola (viol)
Virág (flower)
Zilah (former Hungarian city)
Zombori (former Hungarian city)
Zólyomi (former Hungarian city)
This list is not complete, it consist only the most common public place names.
In Budapest the name of former Hungarian cities (see: Treaty of Trianon) are very common for streets and squares. For example, there are 8 Kolozsvár streets and 9 Kassa streets.

Most common public place names 
17x : Lajos Kossuth, István Széchenyi
16x : Sándor Petőfi
14x : János Hunyadi, Mátyás király, Ferenc Rákóczi
13x : János Arany, József Bem, Mór Jókai, Szabadság, Szent István, Mihály Vörösmarty
12x : Árpád, Gábor Baross
11x : Endre Ady, Attila, Brassói, Ferenc Deák, József Eötvös, Erzsébet, Attila József
10x : Álmos, Lajos Batthyány, István Bocskai, Kassa, György Klapka, Nap, Pozsony etc.

Former public place names 
Moszkva tér (Moscow Square), 1951–2011, now Széll Kálmán tér
Lenin körút (Lenin Boulevard), 1970–1990, now Erzsébet and Teréz körút
Sztálin út (Stalin Avenue), 1950–1956, now Andrássy Avenue
Népköztársaság útja (Avenue of the People's Republic), 1957–1990, now Andrássy Avenue
Majakovszkij utca (Mayakovsky street), 1950–1990, now Király utca
Tolbuhin körút (Tolbukhin Boulevard), 1945–1990, now Vámház körút
Dimitrov tér (Dimitrov Square), 1949–1991, now Fővám tér
Hitler tér (Hitler Square), 1938–1945, now Kodály körönd
Roosevelt tér (Roosevelt Square), 1945–2011, now Széchenyi István tér
Mussolini tér (Mussolini Square), 1936–1945, now Oktogon
 November 7. tér (7 November Square), 1950–1990, now Oktogon
Marx tér (Marx Square), 1950–1990, now Nyugati tér
Felszabadulás tér ("Liberation" Square), 1953–1990, now Ferenciek tere
Élmunkás tér (lit. "Top Worker" Square) until 1990, now Lehel tér

See also
Budapest
Greater Budapest
Budapest metropolitan area
Demographics of Budapest
History of Budapest

Sources 
Budapest City Atlas, Szarvas-Dimap, Budapest, 2006, -CM
Budapest City Atlas, Szarvas-Dimap, Budapest, 2011, 
Budapesti útmutató, street names, 1969
Budapest City Atlas, 1974

 
Names
Geography of Budapest
Budapest, street names
Budapest-related lists